Dr. D. R. Nagaraj (20 February 1954 – 12 August 1998) was an Indian cultural critic, political commentator and an expert on medieval and modern Kannada poetry and Dalit movement who wrote in Kannada and English languages. He won Sahitya Akademi Award for his work Sahitya Kathana. He started out as a Marxist critic but renounced the Marxist framework that he had used in the book Amruta mattu Garuda as too reductionist and became a much more eclectic and complex thinker. He is among the few Indian thinkers to shed new light on Dalit and Bahujan politics. He regarded the Gandhi-Ambedkar debate on the issue of caste system and untouchability as the most important contemporary debate whose outcome would determine the fate of India in the 21st century.

He was one of the founders of the Bandaya movement along with Shudra Srinivas and Siddalingaiah, and gave the movement its famous slogan, "Khadgavagali kavya! Janara novige midiva pranamitra!" ("Let poetry be a sword! The dear friend who responds to the pain of people!")

Early life 
Doddaballapura Ramaiah Nagaraj was born on 20 February 1954 to Ramaiah and Akkayyamma in Doddaballapur in the erstwhile Mysore State of India (present-day Karnataka). His family belonged to the weaver caste and his father was a teacher. Nagaraj was schooled in his home town, after which he studied at the Government Arts and Science College, Bangalore. He was known as an excellent debater in college and it was during these intercollegiate debates that he got interested in Dalit and Bahujan politics.

Nagaraj went to study further and obtained a master's degree and then a PhD from Bangalore University. In 1975, he joined Bangalore University as a research scholar in the Kannada Department (formally known as the Kannada Adhyayana Kendra), and subsequently became part of the Kannada faculty.

Career
Nagaraj rose through the ranks at the Bangalore University quickly, becoming a Reader and then, just before his death in 1998, he was named for the newly established Kailasam Chair.

In addition to his primary affiliation with the Kannada Department of Bangalore University, Nagaraj was a fellow at the Indian Institute of Advanced Study, Shimla (1993–4); Senior Fellow at the Centre for the Study of Developing Societies (CSDS, Delhi (1994–6); and visiting professor in the Department of South Asian Languages and Civilizations at the University of Chicago (1997 and 1998).

Nagaraj wrote six books among several essays in Kannada. He has also edited 15 Kannada books, including an anthology of Urdu literature. Flaming Feet is his collection of essays on the Indian Dalit movement whose title article "Flaming Feet" discusses the varied philosophies of Mahatma Gandhi and B. R. Ambedkar on Dalit emancipation and tries to find an underlying unity. A revised and extended version of this book was posthumously published as The Flaming Feet and Other Essays: The Dalit Movement in India in 2011. Listening to the Loom: Essays on Literature, Politics and Violence is his other collection of essays. These books have been translated into Tamil and Telugu languages. He also published many essays in English. Many of his Kannada essays have been translated into English and other languages since his death.

At the time of his death in 1998, Nagaraj was serving as the Director of Shabdana — Centre for Translation, a project of the Sahitya Akademi, and editor of Akshara Chintana, a series of critical works published by Akshara Prakashana of Heggodu. In the months preceding his death, he was "probing the nature of feminism as a frame for a new dalit literary criticism."

Personal life
Nagaraj met his wife Girija, while he was teaching at Bangalore University. Girija was a student of literature as well as science. They have two children, Amulya and Anoop. Nagaraj died of a heart attack in 1998, aged just 44.

Select bibliography 

Dr. Nagaraj published his first book, Amruta mattu Garuda (Nectar and the Eagle) in 1983 and the second book, his PhD thesis on modern Kannada poetry and poetics, Shakti Sharadeya Mela (The Festival of Shakti and Sharade) shortly thereafter. Between 1987 and 1993, he mostly published critical essays in English and Kannada. He also edited a lot of important books.

Critical works 
In Kannada 
 Amrutha Mattu Garuda (1983) (Marxist analysis of Modern Kannada literature)
 Shakti Sharadeya Mela: Adhunika Kannada Kavyada Adhyanana Heggodu: Akshara Prakashana (PhD thesis on Modern Kannada poetry and poetics)
 Sahitya Kathana (1996) Heggodu: Akshara Prakashana
 Samskriti Kathana (2001) Ed. by Agrahara Krishnamurthy 
 Allama Prabhu Mattu Shaiva Pratibhe (1998) Heggodu: Akshara Prakashana. (on the 12th century Vachana poet Allama Prabhu. Published posthumously)
In English
 The Flaming Feet: The Dalit Movement in India (1993) Bangalore: Institute of Cultural Research and Action.
 The Flaming Feet and Other Essays: The Dalit Movement in India (2011) Ed. Prithvi Datta Chandra Shobhi. Ranikhet: Permanent Black. .
 Listening to the Loom: Essays on Literature, Politics and Violence (2014) Ed. Prithvi Datta Chandra Shobhi. Seagull Books, 2014.

Edited and translated 
 Urdu Sahitya (1990) - Edited volume of Urdu Literature
 Vasanta Smriti (1993) - Translation of Jalaluddin Rumi's poems

Awards and honours 
 Vardhamana Award (1988)
 Shivarama Karanth Award (1995) 
 Sahitya Akademi Award (Posthumous, 1998)

References

External links 
 Critical Tensions in the History of Kannada Literary Culture by D.R. Nagaraj in Literary Cultures in History: Reconstructions from South Asia (2003) ed. by Sheldon Pollock. 
 Rooted Cosmopolitan: D.R. Nagaraj by Ramachandra Guha
 D.R. Nagaraj talks about the conflict between Desi and Marga. Kannada audio.

Recipients of the Sahitya Akademi Award in Kannada
1954 births
1998 deaths
Writers from Karnataka
Bandaya writers
Kannada-language writers
People from Bangalore Rural district
Bangalore University alumni
Academic staff of Bangalore University